Te Ahuahu is a 373 m high andestic basaltic scoria cone to the west of Lake Ōmāpere, in the Kaikohe-Bay of Islands volcanic field in New Zealand.

It was the site of Hone Heke's pā  that was the scene of the Battle of Te Ahuahu during the Flagstaff War of 1845–46. Here on 12 June 1845 a Maori raiding party lead by Tāmati Wāka Nene captured the pā after Hone Heke left it to gather food. During failed attempts to retake the pā, Hone Heke was seriously wounded when shot in the thigh and at least 30 of his men were killed or wounded.

References

Geological Society of New Zealand

Forts in New Zealand
Far North District
Volcanoes of the Northland Region
Volcanic cones
Flagstaff War